Macmillan Pass Airport  has a  runway and receives no maintenance. It is along the Canol Road.

The airport is located on the Continental Divide near the border of Yukon and Northwest Territories, Canada. The airport is generally used to support resource exploration and tourism.

References

Registered aerodromes in Yukon